David Michael Garrood Newbery, CBE, FBA (born 1 June 1943), is a Professor of Applied Economics at the University of Cambridge. He got this position in 1988. He specializes in the field of energy economics, and he writes on the regulation of electricity markets. His interests also include climate change mitigation and environmental policy, privatisation, and risk.

Early life
Newbery was born on 1 June 1943 at Fulmer Chase, Fulmer, Buckinghamshire, England. He studied at Portsmouth Grammar School from 1954 till 1961, where he won Best Science Candidate in Cambridge GCE A&S Level. He then proceeded to study Mathematics and Economics at Trinity College, Cambridge, obtaining a B.A. in 1964, M.A. (Cantab.) in 1968 and a Ph.D. degree in 1976.

Career 

In 1965 he was pre-elected to Churchill Teaching Fellowship. In 1966 he got a position of University Assistant Lecturer at Faculty of Economics. Later he was a Director of Department of Applied Economics from 1988 till 2003. He also served as a Professor II at Tromso University, Norway from 2011 till 2013.

In 1981 Newbery co-authored a book and several articles with Nobel-laureate Joseph Stiglitz. The name of the book was "The Theory of Commodity Price Stabilization: A Study in the Economics of Risk"

Besides his role as Professor of Applied Economics at Cambridge, he serves as Vice-Chairman of Cambridge Economic Policy Associates, Director of the Cambridge Electricity Policy Research Group and an occasional consultant to the World Bank. In 1988–2003 he was Director of the Department of Applied economics. He was a member of the Competition Commission in 1996–2002, and chairman of the Dutch electricity market surveillance committee. He was elected a Fellow of the British Academy in 1991. He is a member of the Academic Panel of DEFRA. Since 1966 he has been a fellow of Churchill College, and was President of its Senior Combination Room (SCR) in from 2010 to 2019.

Honours 
Newbery was appointed Commander of the Order of the British Empire (CBE) in the 2012 Birthday Honours for services to economics.
 He was awarded an Honorary Doctorate by the Paris Dauphine University in 2022
 He was elected Fellow of Econometric Society in 1989.
 He was awarded Frisch Medal of the Econometric Society in 1990.
 He was awarded Harry Johnson Prize by Canadian Economics Association in 1993.
 He received the IAEE 2002 Outstanding Contributions to the Profession of Energy Economics Award.
 He was awarded an Honorary Degree at the University of Antwerp in 2004.
 He was president of International Association of Energy Economics in 2013.

Selected bibliography

Books

Journal articles 
 
 
 
 
 Newbery, D.M. and J.E. Stiglitz (1982) ‘The Choice of Techniques and the Optimality of Market Equilibrium with Rational Expectations’, Journal of Political Economy, 90(2), April, 223-46. doi: https://www.jstor.org/stable/1830291?seq=2#references_tab_contents. JSTOR 1830291.

References

1943 births
21st-century British  economists
20th-century British  economists
Alumni of Trinity College, Cambridge
Academics of the University of Cambridge
Commanders of the Order of the British Empire
Fellows of the British Academy
Fellows of Churchill College, Cambridge
Fellows of the Econometric Society
Living people